The province of Campobasso is a province in the Molise region of southern Italy. Its capital is the city of Campobasso.

It covers an area of c.  and has a total population of 223,871 (2017). There are 84 comunes in the province (see Comunes of the Province of Campobasso).

The eastern part of the province is home to a small Croatian minority who speak an archaic dialect of Croatian. The Croatians reside primarily in Acquaviva Collecroce, San Felice and Montemitro.

History
The Samnites, a group of Sabellic tribes, dominated this region of Italy including Campania from around 600 B.C. to 290 B.C. Following the war against Rome in 343 B.C., in 290 B.C. the territory of the ancient Sannio region (the central zone of which lies in the current province of Campobasso) was included in the Roman Regio IV Samnium. In 570, following an invasion by the Lombards, the territory was annexed to the Lombard duchy of Benevento, resulting in a reduction of the estates and assets of the ecclesiastical bishoprics of Bojano, Saepinum, Venafro, Trivento, Isernia, Larino and Termoli. As a result of frequent changes in its ownership, the Lombards called the city Campus Vassorum (Vassals' Territory) which later became Campobasso. The feudal lords increasingly gained power at the expense of the church. The principality of Capua, established in 860, included the counties of Venafro, Larino, Trivento, Bojano, Isernia, Campomarino and Termoli. Hugues I de Molise, Earl of Bojano and Norman feudal lord of Mulhouse (from which derives the name of Molise), implemented a policy to restore the old boundaries to the territories of Sannio in 1053, and finally, thanks to his successor, Hugues II de Molise, Molise was created independently around 1128.

With the advent of the Neapolitan Republic, a new administrative organization was established, divided into departments made up of cantons. The Department of the Sangro was divided into 16 cantons: Lanciano, Ortona, Palena, Atessa, Pescocostanzo, Castel di Sangro, Agnone, Baranello, Campobasso, La Riccia, Trivento, Larino, Termoli, Serra Capriola, Dragonara, and Vasto. On 27 September 1806, after the French occupation, Molise became an autonomous province consisting of the districts of Campobasso and Isernia, to which the districts of Larino and Agnone were added. Following a constitutional amendment in December 1963 the province of Campobasso was detached from Abruzzo, given the status of Region, and renamed Molise. The situation remained unchanged until 1970 when 52 municipalities were detached to form the Province of Isernia, established under Law No. 2 of February 1970.

Geography

The Province of Campobasso is situated in eastern Italy on the Adriatic coast. It is bordered to the north by the Province of Chieti in Abruzzo, to the south-east by the Province of Foggia in Apulia, to the south by the Province of Benevento and the Province of Caserta in Campania, and to the west by the Province of Isernia. The terrain is varied extending from the mountainous Apennines, down through hills, lakes and inland rivers to the Adriatic coast. The territory is crossed by the river valleys of the Trigno (85 km), Biferno (84 km) and Fortore (110 km), flanked by hills and mountains. Other rivers of note include the Tammaro (78 km), the Saccione (33 km), the Sinarca (26 km), and the Sassinora (7 km). All flow into the Adriatic with the exception of the Tammaro. The central Valle del Biferno includes the  Lago di Guardialfiera, to the east of Castelmauro. The other lake of note is Lago di Occhito to the south east of Sant'Elia a Pianisi. The provincial capital of Campobasso lies in the south of the province, north of the Matese mountains, one of the three main mountain ranges in the Molise region. On the coast, the principal towns are Termoli and Campomarino.

Demography

The population of the province rose between 1861 when there were 229,393 inhabitants and 1951 when it totalled 289,577. Over the next 20 years it fell back to 227,641 (1971) after which it rose once again to 238,958 in 1991. It has since undergone a slight reduction to 225,622 inhabitants in 2016. As of 1 January 2014, the most populous communes (comuni) in the province are Campobasso (49,392), Termoli (33,478), Bojano (8,125), Campomarino (7,723), Larino (6,910), Montenero di Bisaccia (6,798), Guglionesi (5,422), Riccia (5,332), San Martino in Pensilis (4,827) and Trivento (4,788).

Acquaviva Collecroce, with a population of 714, is the largest of three municipalities in the province where the inhabitants are of Croatian origin. It is believed they arrived at the end of the 15th century from Bosnia-Herzegovina and Croatia. They still speak a Croatian dialect as well as Italian. The other two municipalities with inhabitants of Croatian origin are San Felice del Molise and Montemitro. All three municipalities lie to the north of the city of Campobasso. As of 1 January 2014, San Felice has 664 inhabitants while Montemitro has 420 inhabitants.

Government

List of presidents of the province of Campobasso

Landmarks and attractions
The city of Campobasso has several  landmarks including Manforte Castle (1450), the cathedral and several old churches including San Bartolomeo, Campomarino, Larino (inhabited since the 5th century BC) and the fortifications of Monte Vairano, Gildone, Duronia and Terravecchia di Sepino, the Roman city of Saepinum, with its forum, basilica, baths and theatre.

There are many large castles in the area, including those at Gambatesa, Castropignano, Civitacampomarano and Termoli, while there are many religious buildings of note such as Trivento Cathedral, Larino Cathedral (1319) and the 12th century Church of Santa Maria in Petacciato.

The town of Termoli is a regional seaside resort on the Adriatic sea.

See also
 Molise Croats

References

Literature

External links

Official website
American Descendants of Campobasso Natives From 1890–1930, many left Campobasso and settled in America (many in the state of Connecticut)
Campobasso Genealogy & History Italian-American Surnames originating in Campobasso (di Tota, Pietrunti, di Cesare, Santoro, and others

 
Campobasso